Lost and Beautiful is a 2015 Italian fantasy-drama film produced, written and directed by Pietro Marcello. It was entered into the main competition at the 2015 Locarno International Film Festival.

Plot 
Pulcinella, mask of the Campania tradition, intermediary between the living and the dead, has the mission of fulfilling the last wishes of a simple Campania shepherd, Tommaso Cestrone: to rescue a buffalo named Sarchiapone.

Pulcinella then goes to the Royal Palace of Carditello, a Bourbon residence abandoned to itself in the heart of the land of fires, of which Tommaso was the voluntary guardian and where the young buffalo is found. He takes it with him to the north, on a long journey through a beautiful and lost Italy.

Cast   
 Sergio Vitolo as Pulcinella
 Tommaso Cestrone as  Tommaso
 Gesuino Pittalis as  Pastore
 Elio Germano as Sarchiapone (voice)

See also    
 List of Italian films of 2015

References

External links  

2010s fantasy drama films
Italian fantasy drama films
Films directed by Pietro Marcello
2015 drama films
2015 films
2010s Italian films